Pertoltice is a municipality and village in Kutná Hora District in the Central Bohemian Region of the Czech Republic. It has about 200 inhabitants.

Administrative parts
Villages and hamlets of Budkovice, Chlístovice, Laziště, Machovice and Milanovice are administrative parts of Pertoltice.

References

Villages in Kutná Hora District